The lakes Les Laussets (French: Lacs Les Laussets) are a group of three lakes in the Tinée valley, Alpes-Maritimes, Alps, France.
They are located at an elevation of 2400 m, south-east to the Crête des Terres Rouges, and close to the Tête des Mourres.

Of note, a group of lakes can be found in the vicinity of the lakes Les Laussets: the lakes of Morgon.

Itinerary
On the way of the Col de la Bonette from the Saint-Étienne-de-Tinée side, two main itineraries are possible.

From the Hameau du Pra

From the hamlet of Pra, follow the trail that goes up in the south-facing slope, and reach the small plateau of Morgon. Quit the marked route leading to the forest house of Tortisse, and climb in the valley of Morgon, find a pastoral hut and then walk through a scree slope. On the left, climb the rocky spine to find a secondary valley. Follow the small torrent and then reach the lakes Laussets.

From the Camp des Fourches
From the Camp des Fourches, go to the Col des Fourches. Follow the GR 5 to go down in the Cougnas ravine. Leave the GR at tag 37 (2100 m), cross a ravine, and follow on the right the small footpath in the Cabane valley, along the Salso Moreno torrent. Enter a small rocky gorge on the right, and find the Big Lake of Morgon. From there, walk west to reach the three lakes Les Laussets.

References

External links
  Location of the lakes Les Laussets on a geographical map, Géoportail (IGN).

Glacial lakes of France
Lakes of Alpes-Maritimes